Edward Tate (1877–1953) was an English cricketer.

Edward Tate may also refer to:

Pop Tate (baseball) (Edward Christopher Tate, 1860–1932), Major League Baseball catcher
Ned Tate (Edward Tate, 1901–1967), English footballer in Canada and the United States

See also 
Edward Joseph Tait (1878–1947), Australian theatrical entrepreneur